Prusik Peak is an 8000+ ft granite summit located at the west end of The Temple in Chelan County of Washington state. Prusik Peak is part of The Enchantments within the Alpine Lakes Wilderness, and is often the iconic photographic image of both areas. Prusik Peak belongs to the Stuart Range which is a subset of the Cascade Range.  The name honors Dr. Karl Prusik (1896–1961) who was an Austrian mountaineer, and is known as the inventor of the prusik, a rope knot which happened to be used to gain access to the summit horn during the first ascent by Fred Beckey in 1948. Precipitation runoff drains into Icicle Creek, a tributary of the Wenatchee River.

Climate
Most weather fronts originate in the Pacific Ocean, and travel east toward the Cascade Mountains. As fronts approach, they are forced upward by the peaks of the Cascade Range, causing them to drop their moisture in the form of rain or snowfall onto the Cascades (Orographic lift). As a result, the Cascades experience high precipitation, especially during the winter months in the form of snowfall. During winter months, weather is usually cloudy, but, due to high pressure systems over the Pacific Ocean that intensify during summer months, there is often little or no cloud cover during the summer. Because of maritime influence, snow tends to be wet and heavy, resulting in high avalanche danger.

Geology
The Alpine Lakes Wilderness features some of the most rugged topography in the Cascade Range with craggy peaks and ridges, deep glacial valleys, and granite walls spotted with over 700 mountain lakes.  Geological events occurring many years ago created the diverse topography and drastic elevation changes over the Cascade Range leading to the various climate differences.

The history of the formation of the Cascade Mountains dates back millions of years ago to the late Eocene Epoch. With the North American Plate overriding the Pacific Plate, episodes of volcanic igneous activity persisted.  In addition, small fragments of the oceanic and continental lithosphere called terranes created the North Cascades about 50 million years ago.

During the Pleistocene period dating back over two million years ago, glaciation advancing and retreating repeatedly scoured the landscape leaving  deposits of rock debris. The last glacial retreat in the Alpine Lakes area began about 14,000 years ago and was north of the Canada–US border by 10,000 years ago. The "U"-shaped cross section of the river valleys are a result of that recent glaciation. Uplift and faulting in combination with glaciation have been the dominant processes which have created the tall peaks and deep valleys of the Alpine Lakes Wilderness area.

Climbing Routes

Established rock climbing routes on Prusik Peak:

 East Route  –  First ascent 1948
 West Ridge –    4 pitches FA 1957
 South Face Beckey-Davis Route –   7 pitches FA 1962
 Stanley-Burgner Route  –    6 pitches FA 1968
 Solid Gold  –    5 pitches  FA 1989
 Der Sportsman –    6 pitches

See also

List of peaks of the Alpine Lakes Wilderness
Geology of the Pacific Northwest
Geography of Washington (state)

References

External links
 Prusik Peak weather: Mountain Forecast
Alpine Lakes Wilderness (Okanogan-Wenatchee National Forest) U.S. Forest Service 

Mountains of Washington (state)
Mountains of Chelan County, Washington
Cascade Range
Climbing areas of the United States
North American 2000 m summits